The Southern India Championships was a combined men's and women's tennis tournament was founded in 1889 as the South India Championship. The championships was played at the Madras Gymkhana Club grounds, Madras, Tamil Nadu, India. The championships ran until 1980 before it was discontinued.

History
Tennis was introduced to India in 1880s by British Army and Civilian Officers. As early as 1883 the first tennis courts laid in Madras were at the Madras Cricket Club (MCC). In 1884 Madras Gymkhana Club built its first tennis courts. In 1889 the South India Championship was founded and played at the Madras Gymkhana Club, Madras, Tamil Nadu, India. The championships were staged until 1980 when they were abolished.

References

Defunct tennis tournaments in India
Grass court tennis tournaments